Ponerorchis basifoliata is a species of flowering plant in the family Orchidaceae, native to south-east China (south-east Sichuan, north Yunnan).

Taxonomy
The species was first described in 1902 by Achille Eugène Finet, as Peristylus tetralobus f. basifoliatus. It was later raised to a species and transferred successively to the genus Orchis and then to the genus Amitostigma. A molecular phylogenetic study in 2014 found that species of Amitostigma, Neottianthe and Ponerorchis were mixed together in a single clade, making none of the three genera monophyletic as then circumscribed. Amitostigma and Neottianthe were subsumed into Ponerorchis, with Amitostigma basifoliatum becoming Ponerorchis basifoliata.

References

basifoliata
Flora of Southeast China
Plants described in 1902